Robert Edgar Brodhead (December 20, 1936 – February 11, 1996) was an American gridiron football player, executive, and college athletics administrator.  He was the athletic director at Louisiana State University (LSU) from 1982 to 1987.  He is also the author of Sacked! The Dark Side of Sports at Louisiana State University

Brodhead attended Duke University, where he played quarterback on the Duke Blue Devils football team. During that time he led the Blue Devils to the 1958 Orange Bowl and shared the quarterback position with Sonny Jurgensen.

Brodhead was drafted by the Cleveland Browns in 1958 but went on active duty in the armed services before being able to join the Browns. After his discharge, he played for the Saskatchewan Roughriders of the Canadian Football League (CFL) in 1959, as backup to Don Allard. In 1960, he signed with the upstart Buffalo Bills of the fledgling American Football League (AFL).  He played one season, in 1960, for the Bills, starting one game and scoring two points before having a brief stint with the CFL's Edmonton Eskimos. In 1961, he embarked on a career in minor league football with the Canton Bulldogs and Cleveland Bulldogs in the United Football League and then, in 1965 and 1966 with the Philadelphia Bulldogs of the Continental Football League. He led the Bulldogs to the Continental Football League title in 1966 with a win over the Orlando Panthers, and then, at age 29, was named business manager of the Cleveland Browns.

Brodhead was elected to the Minor League Football Hall of Fame for his career with the Canton/Cleveland/Philadelphia Bulldogs.

Brodhead remained with the Browns until 1970, when he was named general manager of the Houston Oilers. He later became the CFO of the Miami Dolphins before heading to LSU as athletic director (AD) in 1981. He was hired by LSU for his financial acumen after deposed athletic director Paul Dietzel created a million-dollar budget deficit.

Brodhead was the general manager of the Portland Thunder of the World Football League in 1975. Brodhead was the head coach for one game after he fired head coach, Greg Barton. After his one-game stint as the Thunder head coach, Brodhead hired Joe Gardi to take over for the remainder of the season. The World Football League folded on October 22, 1975.

Brodhead hired baseball coach Skip Bertman, who revived the moribund program and took the Bayou Bengals to unprecedented heights, guiding LSU to five national championships (1991, 1993, 1996, 1997, 2000) and 11 trips to the College World Series in 18 seasons (1984-2001). Bertman became LSU's athletic director upon his retirement from the diamond, remaining in the position through June 2008. 

In football, Brodhead inherited coach Jerry Stovall, an LSU All-American running back and safety in the early 1960s, and fired him following a 4-7 season in 1983. Stovall lost three of his last four games in 1982 and was a winless 0-6 in the Southeastern Conference in 1983.  Brodhead replaced Stovall with Bill Arnsparger, the architect of the Miami Dolphins' "No-Name Defense" of the early 1970s. Arnsparger went 26-8-3 in three seasons and coached LSU to the 1986 SEC championship and two Sugar Bowl berths.  By comparison, Stovall was 0-6 in the SEC in his third year while Arnsparger won the SEC championship in his third year. 

Another highly successful Brodhead hire was women's basketball coach Sue Gunter, who coached at LSU for 22 seasons and guided the Lady Tigers to the NCAA tournament 14 times, including the Final Four in her final campaign of 2003-04.  During Brodhead's tenure, LSU men's basketball under coach Dale Brown reached the Final Four in 1986. 

Brodhead later was a radio personality in Baton Rouge, Louisiana and for a time the AD at Southeastern Louisiana University in nearby Hammond.

See also
 List of American Football League players

References

1936 births
1999 deaths
American football quarterbacks
American players of Canadian football
Canadian football quarterbacks
Buffalo Bills players
Cleveland Browns executives
Duke Blue Devils football players
Edmonton Elks players
Houston Oilers executives
Miami Dolphins executives
LSU Tigers and Lady Tigers athletic directors
National Football League general managers
Saskatchewan Roughriders players
Southeastern Louisiana Lions and Lady Lions athletic directors
United Football League (1961–1964) players
Continental Football League players
People from Kittanning, Pennsylvania
Players of American football from Pennsylvania
American Football League players